is a dark, sub-kilometer asteroid and suspected extinct comet, classified as near-Earth object and potentially hazardous asteroid of the Apollo group.

Description 

 is unusually dark for a near-Earth asteroid. It is possibly an extinct comet, but without the comet-like dust and gas cloud. It was first observed on 27 November 2016 by NEOWISE, the asteroid-and-comet-hunting portion of the Wide-Field Infrared Survey Explorer (WISE) mission. According to NEOWISE, this object could have cometary origins, which illustrates the blurry boundary between asteroids and comets. It is speculated that over time, this object has lost the majority of the volatiles on its surface.

2017 approach 

The 2017 approach did not bring it particularly close to Earth.

Discovery 

When  was first announced and had a short insignificant 3 day observation arc, it was estimated to have a 7.6 year orbital period. The preliminary orbit was also listed on the JPL Sentry Risk Table, but none of the virtual impact dates were before 2029. As the observation arc became longer and the orbital parameters better constrained, it was removed from the Sentry Risk Table on 20 December 2016. With a 111-day observation arc, it is now known that it has a 4.86 year orbital period and currently stays inside the orbit of Jupiter.

A simulation of 's dynamics over a period of 100 million days (~274,000 years) found that it had roughly a 60% chance of originating from the outer Solar System as a long-period comet.

References

External links 
 

Minor planet object articles (unnumbered)

20170225
20161127